{{speciesbox
| image = 
| image_caption = 
| taxon = Sisyphus crispatus
| authority = Gory, 1833
| subdivision = * S. c. crispatus
 S. c. hirtus Wiedemann, 1823
 S. c. mexicanus Harold, 1863
| synonyms = * Sisyphus hirtus Wiedemann, 1823
 Sisyphus setosulus Walker, 1858
 Sisyphus subsidens Walker, 1858
}}Sisyphus crispatus, is a species of dung beetle found in India, Sri Lanka and Pakistan.

Description
The subspecies, S. c. hirtus'' has been described as follows.

This oval, highly convex species has an average length of about 6 to 9.5 mm. Body black and opaque. Body covered with brown erect hooked setae. Setae absent on legs and metasternum. Legs are very long and slender. Head moderately strongly closely punctured. Pronotum moderately strongly closely punctured. Elytra a little longer than their combined width. Elytra have shallow striae and slightly convex intervals. Metasternum consists of large punctures. Male has a very slight rectangular projection near the middle of hind femur.

References 

Scarabaeinae
Insects of Sri Lanka
Insects of India
Insects described in 1833